Beinn Ruigh Choinnich is a hill which overlooks the port of Lochboisdale on the east coast of the island of South Uist in the Outer Hebrides Scotland. Its name is sometimes given in English as Ben Kenneth, although a literal translation would be 'the hill of Kenneth's slope'. The origin of the name is unknown. The hill is 275 m in height and can be climbed quite easily.

Every year on the first Sunday in August, a race is held where competitors run from Lochboisdale pier to the top of Beinn Ruigh Choinnich and back to the pier.

External links
Ben Kenneth Hill Race Home Page

Previous winners    

Marilyns of Scotland
Mountains and hills of the Outer Hebrides
South Uist